The following is a list of characters from the British television sitcom Absolutely Fabulous.

Main characters

Edina Monsoon

Edwina Margaret Rose Monsoon (portrayed by Jennifer Saunders), an only child, was born on 6 August 1951 in London, although she turns 40 on screen in December 1992 (when Saunders herself was 34). She later changed her name to Edina and is nearly always called Eddie; only her mother and ex-husband Justin call her Edwina. It is never revealed whether Monsoon is her married name (her daughter Saffron also uses Monsoon, suggesting it might be her father's name) or her birth name. Her mother is referred to as "Mrs M" and her second husband Justin's name is never revealed. Edina is the owner of a successful metropolitan PR company. It seems that this stems partly from her being at the right places at the right times, and around the right people, from the late sixties to early eighties. In a few episodes, she actually demonstrates the creativity, organizational ability and shrewd business sense that have made her successful. She constantly dresses in the extremes of current high fashion and refurbishes her home to keep up with current trends. She is frequently immature, self-absorbed, and lacks self-control, and her daughter, Saffron, is forced to take on the parental role. She is also easily led by best friend Patsy. Several times throughout the series, she demonstrates genuine affection and concern for her daughter, such as fighting off the inappropriate sexual advances of one of her university lecturers and later on guiding her through a difficult childbirth. However, her good intentions are sometimes taken to comical extremes.

Patsy Stone

Eurydice Colette Clytemnestra Dido Bathsheba Rabelais Patricia Cocteau Stone (portrayed by Joanna Lumley), referred to as Patsy, or Pats, is the last of a string of children born to an aging bohemian mother in Paris. She and Edina were childhood friends, and since her mother despised and neglected her, she came to rely on the Monsoons for most of her food (though she has been seen eating only twice since 1973), shelter, and comfort. The first years of her life were spent locked in a room, and the rest of her childhood was dismal by Patsy's own description; without friends, parties or presents. She claims to have blocked out everything before 1968, though occasionally memories come back to her in the form of flashbacks. She is an outrageous, nymphomaniacal, past-her-prime fashion model and "ex-Bond girl" (although Patsy's only actual "Bond" films were Bond Meets Black Emanuelle, Boldfinger, and The Man with Thunder Balls, Lumley was a genuine Bond girl in On Her Majesty's Secret Service) who drinks and smokes to excess. She shares a codependent, parasitic existence with her old schoolfriend Edina. This usually results in hilarious, albeit dysfunctional, behaviour and over-the-top conflicts. Patsy was born on 30 October, and although her actual age is never clearly divulged, she often states herself to be between 39 and 43. In one episode ("Cold Turkey") a nurse guesses that she is around 65 years old. Patsy also has a sister named Jackie, whom Edina abhors and who twice tried to kill Patsy with drug overdoses. Jackie intimidates Patsy into stating that Patsy is the elder of the two and says, in the same episode, that she is 72, to which Patsy replies "My God, then how old does that make me?"

Patsy generally does not express a wide range of emotions, although she makes no secret of her absolute hatred of Saffron, despite asking for her advice on occasion.  She occasionally reveals a more vulnerable side: in flashbacks to her bleak life with her mother, in her overeager admiration for the awful Jackie, and in those rare moments when Edina temporarily withdraws her friendship. Unlike Edina, she is usually conservatively, but stylishly dressed, and almost invariably wears her hair in a characteristic blonde beehive. She has a well-paying, do-nothing job as a director for a fashion magazine, which she received after sleeping with the publisher. She then went on to work at "Jeremy's," an exclusive High Street fashion store with celebrity clients such as Minnie Driver. It is hinted that Patsy has been involved in some questionable activities, such as adult films; she uses her knowledge from that time to blackmail Saffron's prospective mother-in-law. At a party to launch a new Beatles track in the episode "Schmoozin," Patsy's appearance in the low-budget soft porn movie Booberella is shown to the guests, much to her embarrassment. When helped in a situation that someone else might find alarming or disconcerting, Patsy often responds with a calm "Cheers, thanks a lot." During the 1970s in Morocco, Patsy underwent a sex change and briefly lived as a man; but, as Edina says, "It fell off." In a later episode she becomes one of the few tourists to smuggle marijuana into Morocco. She is very promiscuous up until "The Last Shout," then begins to lose her power over men. In two episodes ("Door Handle" and "The Last Shout"), it is revealed that Patsy lives in the storeroom above Oddbins, a chain of UK liquor stores. She says that she has not eaten anything since 1973, having had a "stomach bypass" according to Edina. She is shown in a flashback in the episode "Magazine" to be eating a plate of food. There are two other instances where she does eat: in the episode "New Year's Eve," she painfully chews and swallows a potato crisp, then is visibly shaken from having actually eaten something; and in the Christmas Special "Cold Turkey" she renders the entire assembly speechless by demurely asking for a small slice of turkey during Christmas lunch. Upon eating it she starts to choke. Her sister Jackie mistakes a bowl of potpourri for finger-food in the "New Year's Eve" episode.

Saffron Monsoon
Saffron Monsoon (portrayed by Julia Sawalha), commonly referred to as Saffy, is Edina and Justin's daughter. According to her passport shown in "Paris" (series 4, episode 3), Saffron was born on 17 March 1975. In flashback sequences in the show it appears that Edina intended to have Saffron adopted immediately after her birth (though it is never explained why she changed her mind), and according to Patsy, they tried to abandon her on many occasions. Although most people call her Saffron Edina frequently refers to her as "sweetie", "darling", "sweetie-darling" – which, it is later revealed, became a habit after she forgot Saffron's name when she was very young. Patsy, on the other hand, generally calls her insulting names such as "bitch troll from Hell", and does not even address her by name until the second series. As the ever-virtuous intellectual, Saffron is the perfect foil for Edina and Patsy, enduring abuse from both, especially regarding sexual modesty. Saffron has never been looked after or disciplined by her mother so Saffron remorselessly assumes the moral high ground and the voice of reason. However, her mother's neglectful ways, innumerable slights, and occasional outright cruelties have taken their toll on her, making her excessively cynical, bitter, and sometimes cruel.

Saffron is seen to defend her mother, especially from the controlling influence of Patsy. Saffron encourages her mother to have a boyfriend and an active sex life, something Patsy denies her (presumably for fear of losing the constant attention she craves). Saffron performs nearly all the domestic tasks (even for a brief period when she leaves home), due to her mother's complete inability to look after herself. Saffron was also the only one to grieve when her maternal grandfather died, in contrast to the complete indifference of her mother and grandmother.

She dresses modestly and almost always behaves responsibly; as a result, many unpleasant chores come her way, and she frequently must rescue Patsy and Edina from sticky situations. Despite this, Patsy resents Saffron so intensely that she sold her into slavery whilst in Morocco. Her mother sometimes treats her affectionately, repeatedly reminding Saffron that she does love her, and in one episode, even defends her honour against a university professor who is married with children and deceitfully tries to seduce Saffron, by punching him in the face. Throughout each series, Edina longs for a more exotic, fashionable daughter, and frequently tells her so. Saffron, for her part, passionately wishes to belong to a more normal family, and is once arrested for spying on a random family for her "Observations Diary". Her older brother Serge ran away from home in desperation as a teenager and never calls or writes; nevertheless, he is Edina's favourite child, even though she can no longer remember what he looks like.

In series 4, after completing her education at Regent's College London, she writes a play about her life with her mother called Self-Raising Flower; she means the play to be tragic and is confused when the audience starts laughing. At one point, she becomes involved with New Labour, and says her role model is Cherie Blair. In series 5, when she returns home pregnant from a stint of humanitarian work in Uganda, Edina has nightmares at the prospect of being a grandmother until she learns that Saffron's lover, John Johnson, is black, making the baby mixed race and, as such, a fabulous fashion accessory -– "the Chanel of babies!" Saffron later gives birth to a daughter and names her Jane; Edina, however, persists in calling her "Lola". Saffron and John try to form a relationship and in White Box she travels to Africa to marry him. She returns with only Jane and reveals to her grandmother that although the marriage took place, she is one of John's many wives.

At some point, Saffron became the legal owner of the house in which she and Edina live; it had previously belonged to her father. In the episode "White Box", she at last liberates herself from her mother and Patsy by throwing them out but shortly after, she is arrested for falsifying documents for asylum seekers attempting to relocate to Great Britain. She served two years before being released from prison, at which time she allowed her mum to continue to live in the house so long as she also allows her grandmother to stay there.

In 2012, the Olympic special revealed that Saffron splits her time between her Mother and her new family, living three months in the UK and another in Nigeria with John and Jane respectively so she can continue her charity work. She states that she actually enjoys the company of the other wives, saying they make her feel very special.  Jane remains with John during this time which Saffron claims is for schooling, however Edina suspects it's to keep her away. Whether this is the real reason or not remains unclear.

In the 2016 movie, Saffron reveals she and John are divorced and seems to have accepted that Jane (who is now living in London full-time) is known as 'Lola'. Saffron is dating a policeman known as Nick (Robert Webb).

Bubble and Katy Grin
Bubble (portrayed by Jane Horrocks) is Edina's personal assistant. The character speaks with a strong Lancashire accent, exhibits a daft fashion sense, and acts in a foolish manner. She is unable to remember the names of common objects or understand basic concepts. Bubble's function in the PR company is simply to make Edina look good by comparison.

Alongside her usual personality, Bubble demonstrates rare signs of intelligence, even special abilities. She is revealed to be fluent in French but also speaks in French-sounding gibberish. Bubble has the most eclectic fashion sense out of all the characters. Her outfits are frequently bizarre, overtly theatrical, and parodic of fashion.

At one point in the show, Bubble is made editor of Vogue magazine but it is unclear whether she took up the position, eventually returning to Edina's company. Bubble resigns as Edina's PA on two further occasions: Edina dismisses Bubble for gross incompetence but Bubble sues—and wins—the right to keep her job. However, the details of her job are unspecified and she is demoted to Edina's maid. Bubble later abandons Edina when the PR company is on the verge of a takeover. Damon (Antony Cotton) replaced her as Edina's PA. Bubble has returned to the role for subsequent episodes.

Bubble's lookalike cousin, Katy Grin (also portrayed by Horrocks), is a slick but aggressive and arrogant television presenter who speaks with standard Received Pronunciation. Katy Grin shows no real affection for any of the characters and gleefully issues bitchy backhanded compliments at the protagonists. She has an unnamed baby son born through artificial insemination from an anonymous father.

The creation of Katy Grin was due in part to Jane Horrocks' reluctance to reprise the role of Bubble as the show progressed, turning down the chance to appear in the 1996 special The Last Shout. When the series was revived, Horrocks urged Jennifer Saunders to replace Bubble with the character "Yitta Hilberstam", an Icelandic waitress Horrocks had played in Saunders' 2000 sitcom pilot, Mirrorball. Horrocks ultimately returned to Absolutely Fabulous when Saunders created Katy Grin for series 4.

Another character portrayed by Horrocks is the American character Lola, a dimwit with enormous hair, who worked with Bo and Marshall on their TV ministry. She spoke with a Southern USA accent. The character appeared in the 2002 special Gay and as part of Saunders' scathing parody of televangelism in the USA.

In the 2016 movie, Bubble reveals that she is a millionairess with a very large sea front home in the south of France, thanks to years of embezzlement from Edina's company, where Bubble has been paying herself extra as she had control of the books.

Horrocks played a Shirley Bassey impersonator in the 2016 movie version, adding a fourth character to her repertoire.

Mother
Mother (portrayed by June Whitfield) is Edina's mother and Saffron's grandmother. While her name is unknown, she is referred to as Mrs M by Patsy and as Gran by Saffron. A good-natured elderly woman, she is detested by her daughter but adored by her granddaughter, who sees her as the traditional mother figure Edina never was. She has an ambiguous relationship with Edina and seems to regard her with indifference, giving all her motherly devotion to Saffron. In the earlier series, she is a valuable ally for Saffron in her struggle for domestic control, often mentioning embarrassing facts from Edina's and Patsy's childhood.

Edina addresses her, usually indirectly, as "Old Woman", and only four times in the series as "Mum". Edina is highly sceptical when her mother shows any signs of forgetfulness or confusion, usually commenting "She knows" with an arched eyebrow. Edina's insults never seem to affect her; in fact, she usually manages to retaliate with a few hard-hitting but humorous insults of her own. Sometimes she recognises the eccentricities of Edina, Patsy, and visitors to the house. At times she even seems to see the dysfunctional qualities in Saffron.

She first appears in the first episode, although only in Edina's flashback to her teenage years. In the second episode, "Fat", she visits Edina's home to see Saffron, and in the third episode, "France", goes to stay there while Edina is abroad. In the same episode, she meets Patsy for what seems to be the first time in a long time ("Still blonde then?", remarks Mother). Patsy seems uneasy around Mother, but in later episodes, appears to be fond of her, despite the odd snide comment between the two.

Later episodes reveal that Mother had been a sort of surrogate mother to Patsy, whose own mother neglected her. Patsy shows her some respect, even helping her at times; however, Mother sometimes makes condescending remarks about Patsy, even in her presence, once telling Edina that "poor dear sad old Patsy" is not a suitable or reliable friend. Mother even confused a drag queen for Patsy on one occasion.

When Mother's never-seen husband dies in the episode "Death", Edina infuriates Saffron by responding to the news with a blank stare and the question "Did he leave a will?" Mother doesn't seem to care much either (she had to make a note of his funeral date), realising that she'll have a bit more room at her house, and explaining to Saffron that she has had longer to get used to the idea of her husband dying. In this episode, Mother states that she was married for "nearly forty years", despite it beings established in series 1, episode 5, that Edina was 40, which could suggest Edina was born before her parents were married.

Mother displays a kleptomaniacal streak at times, taking random items from Edina's household (mugs, ashtrays, clothing) and donating them to the charity shop she volunteers at. In series 4, episode 5, "Small Opening", she is seen to be stealing larger pieces of furniture and asks for Patsy's help to remove a wardrobe that has become "stuck on the stairs" that she is donating to Sheltered Housing.

In two scenes throughout the entire run of the show are she and Edina alone together, and it proves to be an awkward experience for both of them. The two are left alone together briefly in an earlier episode, but they continued their conversation as normal. After series 3, her mental faculties begin to decline and she increasingly inhabits a strange world of her own.

Recurring characters

Justin
Justin (portrayed by Christopher Malcolm) is Saffron's father and Edina's second ex-husband. He is gay and keeps an antique shop with his partner Oliver, a frequent guest in the earlier series. Justin tries hard to be the best father he can to Saffron and the two of them have what is probably the healthiest relationship on the show; however, he sometimes seems quite afraid of Edina, and it is never explained why he left the infant Saffron in her care. It is never explained whether Saffron has retained her mother's maiden name or is using that of her father, as neither Justin's nor Saffron's Grandmother's last names are ever revealed. Saffron uses the surname Monsoon, as she introduces herself on a phone call as Saffron Monsoon in The Last Shout Part 2. Justin and Edina put up with each other for Saffron's sake but are not always successful in carrying out this charade. At times Edina seems to be extremely bitter over the dissolution of their marriage, and she is also jealous of the warm relationship he shares with Saffron. Patsy and Justin have a variable relationship. They often act antagonistically toward each other, but other times seem to get along well. Oliver and Saffron are friends; he despises Patsy and loathes Edina. Justin is revealed to be Canadian and usually walks with a cane.

Sarah
Sarah (portrayed by Naoko Mori), is a studious girl and Saffron's best friend since childhood. In the beginning of the series, she rarely drinks, but by series 4, Sarah carried a flask in her jacket, drinking even while working as the stagehand on Saffron's play. Sarah is Saffron's Patsy-figure in tempting Saffron to try drinking alcohol and teasing her about her romantic endeavours, real or imagined. Because of her timid demeanour, Sarah is often the subject of Edina's derision and physical abuse. Edina consistently refers to her as "Titicaca" and once (off-camera) set her pigtails on fire with a candle. This event, which Sarah insisted on referring to as a chemical peel, triggered Sarah to seek professional counselling, which seemed to drive her into a deeper state of imbalance. In the series 4 and 5, Sarah starts to unravel, becoming more and more unstable, and eventually takes to stalking Spice Girl Emma Bunton (Mori actually appears in Spiceworld: The Movie with Bunton as a close friend of all the Spice Girls), another friend of Saffron. At this point, Saffron realises Sarah needs more professional help and reports her to the police. In the 2011 Christmas Special, Sarah has been sectioned due to hearing 'voices' and had been recently released after treatment, but a slap from Saffron causes the voices to return.

Bo Chrysalis Turtle
Bo Turtle, née Chrysalis, (portrayed by Mo Gaffney) is Marshall's second wife throughout most of the series, although in series 1, she is one of several of Marshall's Los Angeles girlfriends. She is loud and obnoxious, but with warm and caring tendencies. However, on one occasion, she tried to steal Saffron's baby but actually made away with the placenta. She is a nurse by training but we see her in this role only once in the series when Patsy is living in New York. In the episode "Birthin'", Marshall reveals that Bo is currently a dental nurse, when she was trying to help Saffron deliver. She tends to have a drug and alcohol problem when she's experiencing hardships. Both Bo and Marshall experiment with different religious groups throughout the show, including Christianity, Judaism, and Scientology. Two of the series highlights for Bo involved her appearing on television; one was an infomercial where she was selling Staylene - "the non fat fat-eating product for the faith community"; and the other, in the special "White Box", saw Bo and Marshall running an evangelistic Christian channel, scamming viewers out of money, constantly shouting "praise him!" and performing ersatz exorcisms.

Marshall Turtle
Marshall Turtle (portrayed by Christopher Ryan) is Edina's first ex-husband and father to Serge. Marshall is an unsuccessful Hollywood producer who later begins pursuing other money-making schemes with his wife, Bo. Bo dominates him easily, and when he is with her he seems more like a young child than a husband. Early in the series, however, Marshall manifests a more masculine, adult persona when he appears with Sondra, a grief therapist who can handle everything about grieving except death itself, and Cherysh (Rebecca Front), a classic California airhead who designs greeting cards for "births, deaths, [and] reincarnations". Marshall is generally kind to Saffron (perhaps pitying her for having to live with Edina), and is often on hand for family events, even making a trip to London just to see the opening of her play. Nonetheless, he does comply with Bo's attempt to steal her baby to be sold through their own private adoption agency to Hollywood actors wishing to adopt. It was hinted later in the series that Marshall had some homosexual feelings, although this was dismissed by everyone except Bo, who oscillated between acceptance and panic over the situation. In the 2016 film, Marshall cuts off all payments for Edina's London home, in order to finance his upcoming sex change operation as he transitions to being a woman. This plot development is at odds with the season 1 story Birthday and the season 2 story Poor, when Marshall stopped paying any alimony or support to Edina.

Magda, Fleur and Catriona
Magda, Fleur and Catriona (portrayed by Kathy Burke, Harriet Thorpe and Helen Lederer, respectively) are three recurring characters throughout the series. Initially, the three appear in series one, episode six, "Magazine", as colleagues of Patsy's. Magda is the editor of the magazine where Patsy is Fashion Director, whereas Fleur and Catriona are either editors or directors of other departments—their roles never being specified, although Magda states Catriona is the features editor in their first appearance. A manic executive and businesswoman, Magda often speaks in bizarre headlines with a thick Cockney accent, rarely constructing only one complete sentence; Patsy dubs her "the best editor this side of American Vogue." Fleur and Catriona seem extremely dim: Fleur is obsessed with make-up, whereas Catriona just wants to feature her friends in the magazine at every opportunity.

All three reappear at the beginning of series two, in the first episode "Hospital", when they gather around Patsy's hospital bed, prior to her plastic surgery. When Patsy visits the magazine's office again in episode 4, "New Best Friend", Fleur and Catriona are present, discussing expensive beauty treatments that "don't get you anything", while Magda is only mentioned. In this episode, the office is populated by Hamish, the magazine's eloquent restaurant critic, played by Jennifer Saunders' husband, Adrian Edmondson; Carmen, a filthy-mouthed travel writer, played by Jo Brand; and Suzy, the layout artist who spends all her time playing video games, played by Meera Syal.

In the series 3 episode "Fear", the trio meet up in Edina's kitchen, after the magazine has closed. Magda is appointed the new editor of HQ magazine in New York, taking Patsy with her, and Edina offers Catriona the job of her PA, having fired Bubble. Fleur states she intends to fall back on her Revlon connections to find work. In the two-part special in 1996, "The Last Shout", Catriona is still working as Edina's PA, although this seems to be temporary while Bubble is away editing French Vogue. Fleur and Magda are both guests at Saffron's wedding, which is the last time Magda appears in the series. By series 4, it seems that Fleur and Catriona have now become friends with Edina and Katy Grin. In episode four, "Donkey", they are part of a regular dining group with Edina, Patsy, and Katy, and by the final episode of series 4, "Menopause", both are working for Edina in her TV production company. Catriona then joins "Menopausals Anonymous" and attends a meeting held in Edina's house. The two appear again in the special "Gay", having returned from London Fashion Week with Patsy. In series five, episode six, "Schmoozin'", Fleur and Catriona appear to be working at 'Jeremy's' with Patsy, and intend to complain to Jeremy about Patsy's behaviour. They rescind this when Patsy threatens to kill Fleur. The two reappeared again in the 2003 Christmas Special, "Cold Turkey" (aka "Drinkin'") when they visit Patsy in hospital, and in the 2012 episode "Job".

Like Bubble, the two characters seem extremely dimwitted, but somehow manage to hold down jobs at various magazines or shops. Catriona often appears to be oblivious of any conversations taking place around her, and indeed when the magazine they all work for closes, it isn't until much later, back at Edina's house, that she grasps the news, having been "in the loo" when the closure was announced.

Patsy is working for Magda again as a fashion editor at a magazine in the 2016 film version.

Patsy's Mother and Jackie Stone
Two members of Patsy's family are seen in the course of the series. Her unnamed mother, a cold-hearted, absinthe-swilling, bohemian nymphomaniac (portrayed by Eleanor Bron), is seen in flashback in three episodes, and was said by Jackie to have given birth to numerous illegitimate children, with Jackie and Patsy being the last of them. This might technically make Jackie and Patsy half-sisters if they did indeed have different fathers, but it's not made clear that they did. Jackie, however, says "our father" in an episode, and claims he could have been any of the men in any of the bars in France. In the series 1 episode "Magazine", Patsy recalls the misery of her upbringing for Saffron's benefit, which ends with her mother dying in a retirement home. In the series 2 episode "Birth", Patsy again recalls her relationship with her mother, this time recalling the trauma of her birth. Another flashback sequence in the series 5 episode "Cold Turkey" explains Patsy's aversion to celebrating Christmas, thanks to her mother's hatred of the holiday.

Patsy's scheming, conniving, malevolent sister Jackie (portrayed by Kate O'Mara) appears in two episodes. In the series 3 episode "Happy New Year", Jackie visits Patsy and Edina on New Year's Eve 1994, hoping to be able to stay for the long term at Edina's house. Strangely all Edina's family are eager to meet Jackie even though Edina, to everyone's surprise, warns them against it. However, Patsy claims that Jackie was a socialite in the 60s-70s and knew many celebrities including Marlene Dietrich, Bob Dylan, Jacqueline Kennedy and even introduced her to her second husband. Edina also reveals that Jackie was a part of the Baader Meinhof terrorist group. Jackie is particularly cruel to Saffron (of course, this is the one thing about Jackie Edina is prepared to ignore), and later admits she is jealous of Patsy's relatively stable life with people who can tolerate her. She later claims that their mother actually loved Patsy since, out of all the children she had, she bothered to send Patsy to school (although Patsy points out that by the time she went, she was "bigger than the teacher.") Patsy later aids her in stealing money and jewelry from Edina, before Jackie returns to Paris to run her charity for unwanted cats. In the course of the episode, it is revealed that there are many other Stone siblings, but nobody knows how many, as their mother "was such a slut". Jackie also forces Patsy to claim that she is the older of the two, by burning her with a cigarette. Jackie admits to being 72 years old when she is alone with Patsy. Jackie later returns in the series 5 episode "Cold Turkey", when she is summoned to the hospital where Patsy is feared to be dying, apparently from the effects of a voodoo doll in Jackie's possession. In the hospital, the two sisters recall how Jackie stole the "only man Patsy ever loved". After forcing Patsy to leave her everything in her will, Jackie prepares to murder Patsy through a massive heroin overdose. However, it is Jackie who is discovered dead the next morning, the implication being that Patsy managed to turn the tables and that she in fact murdered Jackie.

Bettina and Max
Bettina (portrayed by Miranda Richardson) and Max (portrayed by Patrick Barlow) are the often-mentioned designer friends of Edina. Bettina is first mentioned in the original French and Saunders sketch "Modern Mother and Daughter", but the character described in the sketch did not carry over into the series. Edina makes references to refurbishing Bettina's apartment in the season 1 episode "France". Bettina is the "Queen of Minimalism" and was friends with Edina when they were youngsters, much to Patsy's annoyance, especially since Bettina was seen as a far better friend to Edina than Patsy. She married Max, a fellow designer. They first appeared in flashback in series 2's fourth episode, "New Best Friend", when Patsy was injured by an art installation in their minimalist home. This precedes a visit from the couple to Edina's home in the present time. The impending visit infuriates Patsy, leading to a serious falling out with Edina, who is trying desperately to prepare her home for the minimalist designers. However, upon arrival, the couple have abandoned minimalism and are completely disorganised, slovenly, distraught, and at odds with each other, mainly, it seems, thanks to the birth of their son, a baby with whom neither seems able to cope. Edina  has sex with Max while the baby monitor is on in the room, to hasten their departure.

The two reappear in the 2004 special "White Box", when Edina hires them to redesign her kitchen. Max is now gay and he and Bettina are divorced. Bettina is under heavy medication as a result of Edina's interference in her marriage. It is also revealed by Edina that Bettina had been admitted to Broadmoor Hospital for "stabbing Kelly Hoppen with a glass shard at the Design Awards" and was "only on day release". There are several contradictions about these characters. In the series 1 episode "France", it is stated that Edina is in fact designing Bettina's kitchen as the first of her forays into interior design. In "White Box" it is stated that Bettina and Max's only child is a daughter named Allegra, rather than a son. The daughter had herself voluntarily taken into the care of the local authority.

Claudia Bing
Claudia Bing (portrayed by Celia Imrie) is Edina's main rival who runs a more successful PR agency (Bing, Bing, Bing & Bing) who has a habit of picking up Edina's remaining clients. Edina refers to her as "Claudia bloody Bing", to which Claudia just smiles. Ironically, Claudia generally seems to have relatively unoriginal ideas and is probably less creative and talented than Edina - however, she comes out on top by actually working, something Edina has not quite gotten the hang of. She manages to poach many of Edina's clients when Bubble accidentally leaks their information through an email. With Edina's PR company on the brink of collapse, she manages to dupe Claudia into purchasing a TV company - which has no programmes developed - and giving her back several high-profile clients.

Guest characters

Serge Turtle
Serge Turtle (portrayed by Josh Hamilton) is Edina's older child and only son, fathered by Marshall, Edina's first husband. Serge left home as a university student, and has never returned. He is much loved by Edina, and often used as an example to Saffron of what an ideal child should be in Edina's eyes. In the earlier series of the show, Serge is an unseen character whose somewhat implausible whereabouts are referred to occasionally by Saffron, who is in contact with him. These comments imply he is some sort of scientist, but he seems to oscillate between geology and biology. At one point, Serge does seem to return home, only for Edina to later realise it isn't her son, albeit only after she buys him a "sporty hatchback" and gets him a job on the TV show 'The Word'. Edina is in direct contact with the real Serge at the time of Saffron's wedding, although (off screen) he tells his mother he is unable to make the ceremony, promising to be there for the reception. His bedroom is maintained at the house, although it is off-limits to his mother. She eventually breaks in but realizes she no longer even knows what her son looks like and is shocked when Saffron shows her a picture which she mistakes for Jimmy Osmond. Saffron later dramatizes the moment when Serge left home in her play "Self Raising Flower" which she staged in the episode A Small Opening, where Serge is portrayed on stage by an actor; the first time the character takes any real form in the series.

In the 2002 special "Gay", Serge made his first and only appearance, when Edina and Patsy take a trip to New York City, where Edina plans to track down her son, who, she learns from her mother and Saffron, is gay; fulfilling her dream for her son from his ante-natal days when she "blasted her womb with Donna Summer music." On their arrival in New York, Edina and Patsy track down Serge to a New York bookstore and at first mistake his partner, a flamboyantly gay American named Martin, for Serge. Edina is disappointed at first to find her son is actually a male version of Saffron; a rather reserved and bookish young man, who delights in the fact that he is gay and yet still boring, holding a job in New York's famous Strand Bookstore. However, she embraces her son, who finally reveals that he left because of his mother's overbearing attitude and because she burnt his beloved books due to a claimed allergy to books (Patsy says they did it because they were cold). After some tension, Serge agrees to accompany his mother around New York. Serge recognises Patsy as 'Pat' and has a flashback to when Patsy lived as a transsexual man, something that Saffron was never aware of until she visited Morocco. The episode ends with a flashback, showing that Edina adopted Martin as her son in New York; although Martin is never mentioned or seen again in the series.

Edina's celebrity clients
Edina's three most prominent and recurring clients make regular appearances throughout the show's run, blurring the line between fiction and reality. Each of the three real celebrities appears to have a somewhat tenuous fictitious relationship with Edina and repeatedly dispense with her PR services, only to return to her stable of clients at some point in the future.

Lulu is the most oft mentioned of Edina's clients, first appearing as herself in the season two story New Best Friend when she runs into Edina in a restaurant and is forced to join her for lunch. On this occasion, Edina appears clueless on Lulu’s current engagements, and suggests Lulu needs a really good PR machine to revive her career and asks who does her PR, to which Lulu responds "You do!" In season three, Lulu attends the PR Awards dinner to present an award, but avoids sitting at Edina's table as planned and in the next episode, after being mistaken by Bubble for Clodagh Rodgers, she attempts to fire Edina, but agrees to remain a client for one more month. When Edina is the guest on Desert Island Discs in the 1996 special The Last Shout, she chooses 7 of Lulu's songs as her favourites. Claudia Bing is later managing Lulu's PR, but offers her back to Edina in the episode Menopause, but by the time of the fifth series, she has left again, telling Edina that she "despises" her. She is next seen working with Edina in the 2012 episode Job

Twiggy is Edina's main client through season 4 but is dissatisfied with the work she is being offered, particularly uncomfortable about being the face of the radical gay rights campaign 'Fists Across America'. When she and her husband Leigh Lawson discover they live so close to Edina she threatens to move, and take Edina's mother (who is convinced the couple are Madonna and Guy Ritchie) with them, as Lawson finds her amusing. After getting no further work from her, Twiggy fires Edina and takes on Claudia Bing as her publicist in Menopause.

Emma Bunton becomes a client of Edina's during series 5, having previously been a school friend of Saffron's. The two have kept in touch, but their friendship is strained when Saffron's friend Sarah begins to stalk Emma, leading to her eventual arrest. In one episode, Edina lines out a new career path for Bunton, which turns out to be nothing more than a list of Bunton's professional activities from the previous year. Bunton makes some TV commercials under Edina's direction but baulks when Edina enters her for the Eurovision Song Contest. Bunton is still under Edina's PR umbrella in the 2005 Comic Relief Sketch and the 2012 special Job.

In the 2016 film, Lulu, Emma and Queen Noor are said to be Edina's only remaining clients, along with a "boutique vodka".

Many other celebrities play somewhat fictionalised versions of themselves in Absolutely Fabulous, including Elton John, Minnie Driver, Naomi Campbell, Zandra Rhodes, and Britt Ekland.

References

Absolutely Fabulous
BBC-related lists
Lists of British sitcom television characters